Pusia vicmanoui is a species of sea snail, a marine gastropod mollusk, in the family Costellariidae, the ribbed miters.

Distribution
This species occurs off the Austral Islands, French Polynesia.

References

  Turner, H.; Marrow, M.P. (2001). Five new Vexillum (Costellaria) species from various Indo-Pacific locations and remarks on Vexillum (Costellaria) perrieri (Dautzenberg, 1929) (Neogastropoda: Muricoidea: Costellariidae). Novapex (Jodoigne) 2(2): 43-55
 Herrmann, M. & Salisbury, R., 2012. New deep water Vexillum (Costellaria) species from French Polynesia with new records of Vexillum (Costellaria) vicmanoui Turner & Marrow, 2001 and Vexillum (Costellaria) hoaraui Guillot de Suduiraut, 2007 (Gastropoda: Costellariidae). Gloria Maris 51(5-6): 105-148

External links
 Fedosov A.E., Puillandre N., Herrmann M., Dgebuadze P. & Bouchet P. (2017). Phylogeny, systematics, and evolution of the family Costellariidae (Gastropoda: Neogastropoda). Zoological Journal of the Linnean Society. 179(3): 541-626

vicmanoui